Katkari, or Kathodi, is an Indian language, which is classified with Marathi. It is endangered, with only a few percent of ethnic Kathodi speaking it. The Katkari people live primarily in Maharashtra.

References

Southern Indo-Aryan languages
Culture of Maharashtra
Konkani languages